Scutellinia umbrorum is a species of apothecial fungus belonging to the family Pyronemataceae. This is a common European species, forming clusters of orange discs up to 1.5 cm in diameter on soil or rotting wood in summer and autumn. It is very similar to congeners such as Scutellinia olivascens and can only be reliably identified by microscopic features. S. umbrorum is inedible.

References

Further reading

External links

Scutellinia umbrorum at GBIF

Pyronemataceae
Fungi described in 1822
Inedible fungi
Taxa named by Elias Magnus Fries